Montserrat is an island in the Caribbean Sea, in the Leeward Islands. Its nearest neighbours in the island chain include Guadeloupe to the southeast, Antigua to the north-east and Nevis to the northwest. The island is 16 km (9.9 mi) long and 11 km (6.8 mi) wide, with a coastline of about 40 km.

The island is volcanic and largely mountainous. The Soufrière Hills volcano became active in 1995, causing widespread devastation, including the destruction of the capital and formerly largest settlement on the island, Plymouth. The southern part of the island is now uninhabitable and human settlement is constrained to the north.

Montserrat has two islets, Little Redonda and Virgin, as well as Statue Rock.

Climate 
Montserrat has a tropical climate, with little daily or seasonal temperature variation.

Statistics 

Location:
About 500 km southeast of Puerto Rico

Maritime claims:
Territorial sea:

Exclusive fishing zone:

Terrain:
Volcanic islands, mostly mountainous, with small coastal lowland

Elevation extremes:
Lowest point:
Caribbean Sea 0 m
Highest point:
Prior to 1995, the highest point was Chances Peak (in the Soufrière Hills) at 915 m. Ongoing volcanic activity has created a lava dome estimated at 1,050 m in 2013.

Natural resources:
Negligible

Land use:
Arable land:
20%
Permanent crops:
0%
Other:
80% (2011)

Natural hazards:
Severe hurricanes (June to November); volcanic eruptions

Environment - current issues:
Land erosion occurs on slopes that have been cleared for cultivation.

References

Sources
CIA World Factbook